Burhān al-Dīn Abu’l-Ḥasan ‘Alī bin Abī Bakr bin ‘Abd al-Jalīl al-Farghānī al-Marghīnānī (1135-1197) was an Islamic scholar of the Hanafi school of jurisprudence. He was born in Marghinan near Farghana (in present day Uzbekistan). He died in 1197 (593 AH). He is best known as the author of al-Hidayah, which is considered to be one of the most influential compendia of Hanafi jurisprudence (fiqh).

Life
Al-Marghanini performed the Hajj and visited Medina in the year 544 AH. He was thought to have died on the 14th of Dhu'l-Hijjah in the year 593 AH although one report indicated his year of death as 596 AH. He was buried in Samarqand.

Works
Al-Marghinani works (some extant and others known only from literary references) include:

Nashr al-madhhab
Kitab manasik al-hajj
Kitab fi-l-fara'id (also known as Fara'id al-‘Uthmani)
Kitab al-tajnis wa-l-mazid (collection of fatwas)
Mukhtarat al-nawazil (collection of fatwas, also known as Mukhtarat majmu` al-nawazil and Mukhtar al-fatawa)
Mazid fi furu‘ al-hanafiyya
A commentary on al-Shaybani's al-Jami‘ al-kabir
Kitab bidayat al-mubtadi (his principle work, based on al-Quduri's Mukhtasar and al-Shaybani's al-Jami‘ al-saghir)
Kifayat al-muntaha (unfinished 8-volume commentary on his own Kitab bidayat al-mubtadi )
 Al-Hidayah ("The Guidance"), a work on Hanafi law and an abridgement of his commentary on Muhammad al-Shaybani's al-Jami‘ al-Saghir.

Teachers
Al-Marghinani's most important teachers were:
 Najm al-din Abu Hafs Umar an-Nasafi, author of al-‘Aqa’id al-Nasafiyyah fi al-Tauhid;
 Sadr al-Shahid Husam al-Din Umar bin Abd al-Aziz, the commentator of Adab al-Qadi, the most popular book of Imam Khassaf which contains the Islamic Legal and Judicial System.

See also
 Al-Zarnuji
 Al-Kamal ibn al-Humam
 List of Hanafis
 List of Islamic scholars

References

1197 deaths
Hanafi fiqh scholars
Maturidis
Sunni Muslim scholars of Islam
Transoxanian Islamic scholars
Sharia judges
12th-century jurists
Shaykh al-Islāms